The 1937 Victorian Football Association season was the 59th season of the Australian rules football competition. The premiership was won by the Prahran Football Club, after it came from fourth on the ladder to defeat Brunswick by two points in the Grand Final on 4 September. It was the club's first VFA premiership since it joined the Association in 1899.

Premiership 
The home-and-home season was played over sixteen matches, a reduction from the eighteen games staged in 1936, before the top four clubs contested a finals series under the Page–McIntyre system to determine the premiers for the season.

Ladder

Finals

Awards 
 Geoff McInnes (Brunswick) was the leading goalkicker for the season; he kicked 78 goals in the home-and-home season and 86 goals overall.
 In the parallel Association best and fairest awards:
 Neville Huggins (Williamstown) won the Recorder Cup, polling six votes. Jack Lowry (Prahran), L. Wedgwood (Yarraville) and J. Holden (Prahran) finished equal second with three votes apiece.
 The Association Medal was won jointly by Neville Huggins (Williamstown) and Jack Lowry (Prahran), who tied with 24 votes apiece. It was Huggins' second Association Medal in a row. G. Weber (Brighton) and E. Watson (Oakleigh) finished equal-third with 23 votes.
 Coburg won the seconds premiership. Coburg 9.11 (65) defeated Brunswick 4.13 (37) in the Grand Final on Saturday 28 August at Preston.

External links 
 List of VFA/VFL Premiers

References 

Victorian Football League seasons
VFL